Jane Greer (born Bettejane Greer; September 9, 1924 – August 24, 2001) was an American film and television actress best known for her role as femme fatale Kathie Moffat in the 1947 film noir Out of the Past. In 2009, The Guardian named her one of the best actors never to have received an Academy Award nomination.

Early life
Greer was born in Washington, DC, the daughter of Charles Durell McClellan Greer, Jr., and his wife, Bettie. In 1940, at age 15, Greer suffered from a facial palsy, which paralyzed the left side of her face. She recovered, but the condition may have contributed to her "patented look" and "a calm, quizzical gaze and an enigmatic expression that would later lead RKO to promote her as 'The Woman with the Mona Lisa smile'." She claimed that the facial exercises used to overcome the paralysis taught her the importance of facial expression in conveying human emotion.

On December 4, 1945, Greer had her name legally changed to Jane Greer by a court in Los Angeles. She said of her previous name: "Mine is a sissy name. It's too bo-peepish, ingenueish, for the type of role I've been playing. It's like Mary Lou or Mary Ann."

Career

Music
A beauty-contest winner and professional model from her teens, Greer began her show-business career as a big-band singer. She sang in Washington, DC, with the orchestra of Enric Madriguera. She "sang phonetically in Spanish" with the group.

Film

Howard Hughes spotted Greer modeling in the June 8, 1942, issue of Life, and sent her to Hollywood to become an actress. Hughes lent her to RKO to star in many films (another source says Greer's husband, Rudy Vallee, "helped her get out of her contract with Hughes and secure another pact with RKO Studios") including Dick Tracy (1945), Out of the Past (1947), They Won't Believe Me (1947), and the comedy/suspense film The Big Steal (1949), with Out of the Past co-star Robert Mitchum. Hughes refused to let her work for a time; when she finally resumed film acting, she appeared in You're in the Navy Now (1951), The Prisoner of Zenda (1952), Run for the Sun (1956), and Man of a Thousand Faces (1957). In 1984, she was cast in Against All Odds, a remake of Out of the Past, as the mother of the character she had played in 1947. In 1952, Greer obtained a release from her contract with Metro-Goldwyn-Mayer Studios. She said, "When there is a good role at MGM, the producers want Lana or Ava. There is no chance for another actress to develop into important stardom at the studio".

Television
Greer's noteworthy roles in television included guest appearances on episodes of numerous shows over the decades, such as Alfred Hitchcock Presents, Bonanza, Quincy, M.E., Murder, She Wrote, and a 1975 role with Peter Falk and Robert Vaughn in an episode of Columbo titled Troubled Waters. She even got to make fun of Out of the Past in a parody with Robert Mitchum on TV's Saturday Night Live in 1987. Greer joined the casts of Falcon Crest in 1984 and Twin Peaks in 1990 in recurring roles until her retirement in 1996.

Recognition
Greer was honored with a star on the Hollywood Walk of Fame at 1634 Vine Street for her contributions to the motion picture industry. The star was dedicated on February 8, 1960.

Personal life
Greer married Rudy Vallee on December 2, 1943, in Hollywood, but they separated after three months and divorced on July 27, 1944. On August 20, 1947, Greer married Edward Lasker (1912–1997), a Los Angeles lawyer and businessman, with whom she had three sons, Alex, Steven, and Lawrence, a movie producer (WarGames, Sneakers). Greer and Lasker divorced in 1967. Frank London (an actor and dialogue coach) was Greer's domestic partner from 1965 until his death in 2001, six months before Greer died. Greer was a lifelong Democrat and supported Adlai Stevenson during the 1952 presidential election. Greer was Catholic.

Greer died of cancer on August 24, 2001, at the age of 76, in Bel Air, Los Angeles. Her body was interred at Los Angeles' Westwood Village Memorial Park Cemetery.

Complete filmography

Partial television credits
 The Ford Television Theatre - "Look for Tomorrow" (1953), "One Man Missing (1955)", "Moment of Decision" (1957)
 Celebrity Playhouse - "Diamonds in the Sky" (1955) as Nina
 Zane Grey Theater - "A Gun for My Bride" (1957), "The Vaunted" (1958), "Stagecoach to Yuma" (1960)
 Playhouse 90 - "No Time at All" (1958) as Karen
 Alfred Hitchcock Presents - "A True Account" (1959) as Mrs. Cannon-Hughes
 Bonanza - "The Julia Bulette Story" (1959) as Julia Bulette
 Stagecoach West - "High Lonesome" (1960) as Kathleen Kane
 Thriller - "Portrait Without a Face" (1961) as Ann Moffat
 Burke's Law - "Who Killed My Girl?" (1964) as Lonnie Smith
 Columbo - "Troubled Waters" (1975) as Sylvia Danziger
 Quincy, M.E. - "The Depth of Beauty" (1979) as Dorrie Larkin
 Falcon Crest (1984) as Charlotte Pershing (recurring role, 6 episodes)
 The Law & Harry McGraw - "Murder by Landslide" (1987) as Augusta Stillman
 Saturday Night Live - "Robert Mitchum/Simply Red" (1987) as Kathy (uncredited)
 Murder, She Wrote - "The Last Flight of the Dixie Damsel" (1988) as Bonnie Phelps
 Twin Peaks  (1990) as Vivian Smythe Niles

References

External links
 
 Jane Greer at aenigma
 

1924 births
2001 deaths
20th-century American actresses
Actresses from Washington, D.C.
American film actresses
American television actresses
American racehorse owners and breeders
Burials at Westwood Village Memorial Park Cemetery
Deaths from cancer in California
Singers from Washington, D.C.
RKO Pictures contract players
20th-century American singers
20th-century American women singers
Western (genre) film actresses
Western (genre) television actors
California Democrats
Washington (state) Democrats
American Roman Catholics